Equid alphaherpesvirus 8 is a species of virus in the genus Varicellovirus, subfamily Alphaherpesvirinae, family Herpesviridae, and order Herpesvirales.

References

External links 
 

Alphaherpesvirinae